Chhakka Panja 3 is a Nepalese comedy film from 2018, directed by Deepa Shree Niraula, and produced by Deepa Shree Niraula, Deepak Raj Giri, Kedar Ghimire and Jeetu Nepal for Aama Sarswoti Movies. It is the third film of the Chhakka Panja series. The film tells the story of Youk (played by Deepika Prasai) daughter of headmaster and popular news reporter who gets married to rich and illiterate Raja, son of big politician of her village and tries to improve conditions at a government school but faces hurdles in her goal. The film met with positive response from critics and audience for its story, screenplay, social message, comedy and performance of the cast especially of Kedar Ghimire. The film was a massive blockbuster at the box office breaking several and surpassing its predecessor Chhakka Panja to become the highest-grossing films in Nepal until it was broken in 2022 by K.G.F: Chapter 2 and was the Highest Grossing Nepali film in Nepal until Kabaddi 4: The Final Match surpassed it. The 4th Part of the series was announced in July 2022 with new ensemble cast with only Deepak Raj Giri, Kedar Ghimire, Deepa Shree Niraula and Buddhi Tamang being retained.

Cast 
 Deepika Prasai as Raja's wife
 Deepak Raj Giri as Raja Kaji
 Jeetu Nepal as Thaneshwor
 Kedar Ghimire as Magne Budo
 Buddhi Tamang as Buddhi
 Shivahari Paudel as School Headmaster
 Neer Shah as Kaji
 Kiran K.C. as Pandit
 Basanta Bhatta as Syan Kaji
 Anurag Kunwar as Syan Kaji's son 
 Laxmi Giri as Raja's mother
 Sharada Giri as Kali Budi
 Aahana Pokhrel as Kamali
 Wilson Bikram Rai as English Teacher
 Swastima Khadka as Buddhi's Girlfriend (Special Appearance)
 Priyanka Karki as Rinku TV Presenter (Special Appearance)
 Barsha Raut as Brinda (Special Appearance in a song "Pahilo number ma")

Synopsis 
A headmaster's daughter tries to improve conditions at a government school.

Music

References

External links 
 

Nepalese romantic comedy films
Films shot in Kathmandu
2018 films
Films directed by Deepa Shree Niraula
Nepalese sequel films